The Battle of Chillopampa was the first battle of the Inca Civil War.

Following the death of Sapa Inca Huayna Capac in 1527, his legitimate heir Huáscar had angrily watched as illegitimate son Atahualpa inherited the northern parts of the vast Inca Empire and, probably in 1531, sent his general Atoc to reclaim those areas viewed as rightfully belonging to him and to the line of the dynasty of Manco Cápac. The battle of Chillopampa Plains was the first major encounter, where the vast superiority and tactical experience of Atoc made the Huáscaran side emerge as victors. Atahualpa was captured in battle, but escaped to face the armies of his half-brother again in the battle of Chimborazo.

Chillopampa
History of Ecuador
16th century in the Inca civilization